Mathis Le Berre (born 16 April 2001) is a French racing cyclist, who currently rides for UCI WorldTeam . 

He won the 2022 Tour de Normandie.

Major results
2019
 4th Road race, National Junior Road Championships
2021
 2nd Road race, National Under-23 Road Championships
2022
 1st  Overall Tour de Normandie
1st  Young rider classification
1st Stage 1
 1st Stage 4 Boucle de l'Artois
 2nd Paris–Tours Espoirs
 3rd Overall Tour de Bretagne
 5th Road race, Mediterranean Games
 9th Overall Tour d'Eure-et-Loir

References

External links

2001 births
Living people
French male cyclists
Sportspeople from Saint-Brieuc
Cyclists from Brittany